The Westfield River is a major tributary of the Connecticut River located in the Berkshires and Pioneer Valley regions of western Massachusetts. With four major tributary branches that converge west of the city of Westfield, it flows  (measured from the source of its North Branch) before its confluence with the Connecticut River at Agawam, across from the city of Springfield's Metro Center district.

The Westfield River is the Connecticut River's longest tributary in Massachusetts, although the Chicopee River's basin is much larger, and contributes more water to the Connecticut. The Connecticut's northern tributary, the Deerfield River, is nearly as long as the Westfield, being only  shorter.

During the mid-20th century, the Westfield River was so polluted that it would change color based on the nature of the contaminant. Today, the river is clean enough for swimming. It is a state and locally managed river featuring native trout fishing and rugged mountain scenery in the context of a historical mill town settlement (at Westfield).

History 

On its initial discovery by Massachusetts Bay Colony explorers John Cable and John Woodcock in 1635, the area stretching from the Westfield River's confluence with the Connecticut River to Westfield itself—which, the next year, would all be encompassed in the settlement that came to be known as Springfield—was named the "Agawam River", after the name of the Native American people then occupying the area. Historical literature often refers to Springfield as sitting at the confluence of the Connecticut River with the western Agawam River and eastern Chicopee River. This "Agawam River" is now known as the Westfield River, and should not be confused with the Agawam River in southeastern Massachusetts, which was named in tribute to Springfield's tribe of Native Americans.

Branches of the Westfield River 

Rising in the Berkshire Hills region of Massachusetts, it flows southeastwardly to join the Connecticut River at Agawam—directly across from Springfield's Metro Center (downtown).

The Westfield River has a  drainage area that includes three named branches, which join in Huntington to form the Westfield River's main stem, which flows through Russell into Westfield. The branches are the North Branch (sometimes called the East Branch), which rises in the town of Savoy and flows southeast through Windsor, Cummington, and Chesterfield; the Middle Branch, which rises in the town of Peru and flows southeast through Worthington, Middlefield, and Chester; and the West Branch, which has its origins in Washington and Becket, then flows east through Chester.

From Huntington, the main stem of the Westfield River flows through Russell and Westfield, then forms the boundary between West Springfield and Agawam before ending at the Connecticut River.

Every April, the Westfield River in Huntington is the home of the Westfield River Whitewater Races, the oldest continuously run whitewater race in the United States.

Portions of the river's watershed have been designated the Westfield Creek Wild and Scenic River, and form part of the National Wild and Scenic Rivers System.

External links

 Westfield River Watershed Association
 The Westfield River Watershed Open Space and Recreation Plan Pioneer Valley Planning Commission, 2003.
  USGS site
 Geographic Names Information System feature detail report – ID 619263

Rivers of Hampden County, Massachusetts
Rivers of Hampshire County, Massachusetts
Tributaries of the Connecticut River
Westfield, Massachusetts
Geography of Springfield, Massachusetts
West Springfield, Massachusetts
Rivers of Massachusetts
Wild and Scenic Rivers of the United States